Trion is a town in Chattooga County, Georgia, United States. The population was 1,960 at the 2020 census, down from 1,827 at the 2010 census. Trion is the second-largest incorporated community in Chattooga County, which has a population of approximately 26,000. Trion is known as the denim capital of the world because of the Mount Vernon (formerly Riegel) manufacturing plant, which employs about 4,000 people.

History

Trion had its start in the 1840s when the Trion Mills cotton mill was established there. A post office called Trion Factory opened in 1847, and in 1904 the name was changed to Trion. The name "Trion" was chosen by the mill's three founders (Andrew Allgood, Spencer Marsh, and W.K. Briers) as a way to commemorate their partnership.  The Georgia General Assembly incorporated Trion as a town in 1862.

Though the mill burned in 1875, it was eventually rebuilt, and evolved into what is now the Mount Vernon Mill No. 3.

Geography
Trion is located in northern Chattooga County. U.S. Route 27 passes through the eastern part of the town, leading south  to Summerville, the county seat, and north  to LaFayette.

The Chattooga River, a tributary of the Coosa River, flows through the town.

Demographics

2020 census

As of the 2020 United States census, there were 1,960 people, 837 households, and 553 families residing in the town.

2000 census
At the 2000 census, there were 1,993 people, 832 households and 524 families residing in the town. The racial make-up of the town was 90.72% White, 2.81% African American, 0.40% Asian, 0.05% Pacific Islander, 4.87% from other races and 1.15% from two or more races. Hispanic or Latino of any race were 13.25% of the population.

There were 832 households, of which 26.2% had children under the age of 18 living with them, 44.5% were married couples living together, 12.6% had a female householder with no husband present and 36.9% were non-families. 31.9% of all households were made up of individuals,and 20.4% had someone living alone who was 65 years of age or older. The average household size was 2.40 and the average family size was 2.92.

21.7% of the population were under the age of 18, 10.9% from 18 to 24, 26.8% from 25 to 44, 18.4% from 45 to 64 and 22.2% were 65 years of age or older. The median age was 37 years. For every 100 females, there were 97.1 males.  For every 100 females age 18 and over, there were 95.9 males.

The median household income was $30,107 and the median family income was $37,548. Males had a median income of $26,774 vand females $20,524. The per capita income was $17,098. About 6.3% of families and 9.8% of the population were below the poverty line, including 9.8% of those under age 18 and 13.2% of those age 65 or over.

Education

Trion City School District 
The Trion City School District holds grades pre-school to grade twelve, and consists of one elementary school, a middle school and a high school. The district has 79 full-time teachers and over 2,345 students.
Trion Elementary School
Trion Middle School
Trion High School

2009 flood evacuation
On September 21, 2009, the "Frogtown" area of Trion and low-lying apartments in the town were evacuated when floodwaters overtopped a levee that protects the town. However, the levee never actually failed. Lamar Canada, Chattooga County public works director, described the flood as being "a grave situation for us - it's the first time it's happened in more than a decade".

Notable people
Rick Camp, Atlanta Braves pitcher 1976-1985
Alvin Neelley, convicted murderer

See also
 Mount Vernon Mill No. 3
 Riegeldale Tavern

References

External links
 
 Official site
 First Cotton Mill in Northwest Georgia historical marker

Towns in Chattooga County, Georgia
Towns in Georgia (U.S. state)